Eua expansa is a species of tropical air-breathing land snail, a terrestrial pulmonate gastropod mollusk in the family Partulidae.

The following cladogram shows the phylogenic relations of Eua expansa:

References

Partulidae
Gastropods described in 1872